Kamarda is a village, in Khejuri I CD block in Contai subdivision of Purba Medinipur district in the state of West Bengal, India.

Geography

CD block HQ
The headquarters of Khejuri I CD block are located at Kamarda.

Urbanisation
93.55% of the population of Contai subdivision live in the rural areas. Only 6.45% of the population live in the urban areas and it is considerably behind Haldia subdivision in urbanization, where 20.81% of the population live in urban areas.

Note: The map alongside presents some of the notable locations in the subdivision. All places marked in the map are linked in the larger full screen map.

Demographics
As per 2011 Census of India Kamarda had a total population of 11,658 of which 6,023 (52%) were males and 5,635 (48%) were females. Population below 6 years was 1,602. The total number of literates in Kamarda was 8,648 (86.00% of the population over 6 years).

Transport
The nearest railway station is at Nachinda on the Panskura-Digha branch line.

National Highway 116B (locally popular as Contai-Digha Highway) passes nearby.

Education
Kamarda High School is a Bengali-medium co-educational higher secondary school. It was established in 1921 and has arrangements for teaching from class V to XII. It has a library with 2,500 books and a play ground.

Healthcare
Kamarda Block Primary Health Centre at Kamarda Bazar (with 15 beds) is the main medical facility in Khejuri I CD block. There is a primary health centre at Heria (with 10 beds).

References

Villages in Purba Medinipur district